Amy Malkoff is an American singer-songwriter, musician, producer and artist advocate based on the East Coast. Her music blends acoustic, and pop-folk music. She started auditioning for musical theatre productions at age 5, and by age 15 was touring in semi-professional shows. She has an AB in music from Kenyon College with graduate study at the New England Conservatory of Music.

For seven years, she was half of the duo Raymond Gonzalez and Amy Malkoff, and during that time they produced two full-length recordings, toured consistently, and were included on "When October Goes" (Rounder Records), among other compilations. In 1994, she founded the touring band Deadline Poet, which started out as an all-woman a cappella group, then a full band, and lastly a guitar/keyboard/vocal trio. The group disbanded in October 2000, but not before producing several recordings, and appearing on a handful of compilations.

In 2000, she launched All About Buford, an award-winning pop-funk band that seemed to comfortably fit in that funny niche between a cappella and folk. Their performances consisted of some songs done without instruments, and some with Amy playing guitar, but always with a dedicated beatboxer and many rich harmonies. All About Buford was the 2003 Boston Regional Harmony Sweepstakes champions and runners-up in 2002, and Amy was awarded "Best Original Song" in '03. They also were tapped for coveted formal showcases at both The Falcon Ridge Folk Festival and The Northeast Regional Folk Alliance Conference (NERFA). They recorded one full-length CD, "Supercar", one DVD project, "Deep", some single song recordings, and they appeared on several compilation albums. They disbanded in 2008.

Amy served on the board and staff of The Contemporary A Cappella Society for several years, creating content and helping to produce festivals around the country. She also presented and continues to present workshops, run masterclasses, and sit on expert panels at events around the country. She currently serves as Marketing Director of The A Cappella Education Association (since 2014) and is the Executive Director of The Women's A Cappella Association (since 2012). Both organizations further vocal music for singers of all ages and abilities, and present yearly conferences (in Memphis, TN and Berkeley, CA respectively). She also is one of the producers of Haunted Harmonies, a festival in Salem, MA. For the past several years, she has served as judge for various vocal competitions, most notably Varsity Vocals, the organization on which the Pitch Perfect films are based.

Discography

References

1966 births
American women singer-songwriters
Living people
Singer-songwriters from Massachusetts
Kenyon College alumni
New England Conservatory alumni
Musicians from Philadelphia
Singer-songwriters from Pennsylvania
21st-century American women